Tabutta Rovaşata may refer to: 

 Tabutta Rovaşata (film), a 1996 Turkish film by Derviş Zaim
 Tabutta Rovaşata (soundtrack), a 1996 Turkish album by Baba Zula

tr:Tabutta Rövaşata